Robert Leo Prestel (born February 11, 1936) is an American intelligence official and mathematician  who was Deputy Director of the National Security Agency from 1990 to 1994, during which time he was the highest ranking civilian in the agency. Prestel joined the NSA in 1962 and held many positions prior to being appointed as deputy director, including Director of Education and Training from Deputy Director for Research and Engineering. Among other positions Prestel has served in include trustee for the Institute for Defense Analyses and on the Board of Directors of WJ Communications. He currently serves as trustee emeritus of Institute for Defense Analyses.

Awards Prestel has received for his service to the intelligence community include the President's Distinguished Executive Award in 1988; the Department of Defense Distinguished Civilian Service Award in 1988; and the National Intelligence Distinguished Service Medal in 1991.

References

1936 births
Living people
American intelligence analysts
20th-century American mathematicians
21st-century American mathematicians
Deputy Directors of the National Security Agency
People from Indianapolis